Sucha Beskidzka railway station is a railway station in MSucha Beskidzka (Lesser Poland), Poland. As of 2022, it is served by Koleje Śląskie (Silesian Voivodeship Railways), Polregio, and PKP Intercity (EIP, InterCity, and TLK services). This station is about 2 km West of a newly built (opened in 2017)  station, Sucha Beskidzka Zamek, which serves most InterCity and TLK services while this station serves regional services, and one InterCity service connecting Bydgoszcz to Zakopane.

Train services

The station is served by the following services:

Intercity services (IC) Bydgoszcz - Poznań - Leszno - Wrocław - Opole - Rybnik - Bielsko-Biała - Zakopane
Regional services (PR) Zakopane - Nowy Targ - Chabówka - Skawina - Kraków Płaszów 
Regional services (PR) Zakopane - Nowy Targ - Chabówka - Skawina - Kraków Główny 
Regional services (PR) Sucha Beskidzka - Kalwaria Zebrzydowska Lanckorona 
Regional services (PR) Sucha Beskidzka - Kalwaria Zebrzydowska Lanckorona - Kraków Główny 
Regional services (KŚ)  Katowice - Pszczyna - Bielsko-Biała Gł - Żywiec - Nowy Targ - Zakopane

References 

Station article at koleo.pl

Railway stations in Lesser Poland Voivodeship
Railway stations served by Przewozy Regionalne InterRegio
Railway stations in Poland opened in 1884